Anne Sebba (née Rubinstein, born 1951) is a British biographer, lecturer and journalist. She is the author of nine non-fiction books for adults, two biographies for children, and several introductions to reprinted classics.

Life
Anne Sebba (née Rubinstein) was born in London on 31 December 1951. She read history at King's College London (1969–72) and, after a brief spell at the BBC World Service in Bush House, joined Reuters as a graduate trainee, working in London and Rome, from 1972 to 1978. She wrote her first book while living in New York City and now lives in London.

Her discovery of an unpublished series of letters from Wallis Simpson to her second husband Ernest Simpson, shortly before her eventual marriage to the former King, Edward VIII, later the Duke of Windsor, formed the basis of a Channel 4 documentary, The Secret Letters, first shown on UK television in August 2011, and also a biography of Simpson, That Woman: The Life of Wallis Simpson Duchess of Windsor.

Sebba's books have been translated into several languages including French, Spanish, Portuguese, Japanese, Russian, Polish, Czech and Chinese.

Since working as a correspondent for Reuters, Sebba has written for The Times, The Guardian, The Daily Telegraph, The Spectator, Times Higher Education Supplement and The Independent. She has been cited as an authority on biography.

In 2009, Sebba wrote and presented The Daffodil Maiden on BBC Radio 3. It was an account of the pianist Harriet Cohen, who inspired the composer Arnold Bax when she wore a dress adorned with a single daffodil and became his mistress for the next 40 years. In 2010, she wrote and presented the documentary Who was Joyce Hatto? for BBC Radio 4.

In September 2009, Sebba joined the management committee of the Society of Authors. She was chair of the committee between 2012 and 2014 and is now a member of the Council of the Society of Authors. She is a longstanding member of English PEN and after several years on the Writers in Prison Committee served twice on the PEN management committee. She visited Turkey twice as an official observer for PEN for the trial of journalist Asiye Guzel Zeybeck. She has served on the judging panel of the Jewish Quarterly-Wingate Literary Prize. and has twice been a judge for the Biographers' Club awards. In 2012, Sebba spoke at the Beijing and Shanghai Literary Festivals and the Sydney Writers' Festival.

Sebba is a Trustee of the National Archives Trust (NAT), a senior research fellow of the Institute of Historical Research (IHR), and a fellow of the Royal Society of Literature.

Critical reception
Jennie Churchill: Winston's American Mother was reviewed, inter alia, in The Independent, The Daily Telegraph, and The Scotsman,

That Woman was described in The New York Times Sunday Book Review as a "devourable feast of highly spiced history…which acquires the propulsive energy of a thriller as it advances through Wallis's life". and in The Washington Times as "a delicious new biography… meticulously researched".

In 2016, Sebba published Les Parisiennes: How the Women of Paris Lived, Loved and Died in the 1940s (Weidenfeld & Nicolson UK), published in the United States as Les Parisiennes: How the Women of Paris Lived, Loved and Died under the Nazi Occupation (St Martin's Press). This was described as "fascinating and beautifully written" by The Spectator and was the joint winner of the Franco-British society's book prize for 2016.

Les Parisiennes has been translated into Chinese, (SDX) Czech (Bourdon) and French (La Librarie Vuibert). In 2018, a reviewer in Le Figaro Magazine coined the phrase "La Méthode Sebba" to describe the author's method of linking interviews with living people and archive material to create a tableau of women during the dark years.

Ethel Rosenberg: A Cold War Tragedy, published by Weidenfeld & Nicolson (UK) in 2021, concerns the Rosenberg espionage case.  Sebba's book was described by Oliver Kamm, in a Times review, as "wildly false and an intellectual disgrace... Sebba’s incuriosity runs through this alternately saccharine and obtuse book, of which nothing good can be said and from which nothing but harm will arise." Adam Sisman of the Literary Review said “In Anne Sebba, Ethel Rosenberg has found the ideal biographer, sympathetic without being blind to her faults and with a sure understanding of the period … Her portrayal is compelling”. In the San Francisco Chronicle Carl Rollyson described the book as a "compassionate account of Ethel's character as a wife and mother" and an "engrossing narrative". In The Critic Gerald Jacobs described Sebba's reconstruction of the trial as “gripping” and went on to say “Anne Sebba has given Ethel Rosenberg a towering memorial”. In The Telegraph Jake Kerridge said "Sebba gets her readers under the skin of both Ethel and her era so effectively that this shameful saga had me alternately close to tears and boiling with rage. She is right to identify this as a uniquely despicable episode in US history."  Rachel Cooke in the Observer called Ethel Rosenberg as "a powerful biography" and "gripping". In The Guardian Melissa Benn said "Sebba has dug deep beneath this famous and archetypically male story of spying, weapons and international tensions to give us an intelligent, sensitive and absorbing account of the short, tragic life of a woman made remarkable by circumstance".

Bibliography 
 Mother Teresa 
 Margot Fonteyn
 Samplers
 Laura Ashley: A Life By Design
 Enid Bagnold: A Life
 Mother Teresa: Beyond the Image 
 Battling For News
 The Exiled Collector: William Bankes and the Making of an English Country House
 Jennie Churchill: Winston's American Mother 
 That Woman
 Les Parisiennes: How the Women of Paris Lived, Loved and Died in the 1940s
 Ethel Rosenberg: A Cold War Tragedy

References

External links
 

1951 births
Living people
British biographers
British women writers
Alumni of King's College London
Women biographers